Kheralu is a city and a municipality in Mehsana district in the Indian state of Gujarat. It is a little north of Mahesana Proper town and it is approximately half the size of
Mehsana.

History 
A Bodhisattva sculpture from 3rd-4th century CE was discovered in Kheralu.

Kheralu was home for a community of Humbada Jains in the 15th-16th century CE.

Geography
It has an average elevation of 149 metres (488 feet). It is the second largest town in its district after Mehsana proper town.

The river Rupen flows through the taluka of Kheralu. Originating from the hills of Taranga in Kheralu, it eventually flows into the Little Rann of Kutch.

Demographics
 India census, Kheralu had a population of 20,143. Males constitute 52% of the population and females 48%. Kheralu has an average literacy rate of 68%, higher than the national average of 59.5%: male literacy is 76%, and female literacy is 59%. In Kheralu, 13% of the population is under 6 years of age.

References

Cities and towns in Mehsana district